Mercury Records is an American record label owned by Universal Music Group. It had significant success as an independent operation in the 1940s and 1950s. Smash Records and Fontana Records were sub labels of Mercury.  Mercury Records released rock, funk, R&B, doo wop, soul music, blues, pop, rock and roll, and jazz records. In the United States, it is operated through Republic Records; in the United Kingdom and Japan (as Mercury Tokyo in the latter country), it is distributed by EMI Records.

Since the separation of Island Records, Motown, Mercury Records, and Def Jam Recordings combining the Island Def Jam Music Group, Mercury Records has been placed under Island Records, although its back catalogue is still owned by the Island Def Jam Music Group (now Island Records).

Background
Mercury Records was started in Chicago in 1945 and over several decades, saw great success. The success of Mercury has been attributed to the use of alternative marketing techniques to promote records. The conventional method of record promotion used by major labels such as RCA Victor, Decca Records, and Capitol Records was dependent on radio airplay, but Mercury Records founder Irving Green decided to promote new records using jukeboxes instead. By lowering promotion costs, Mercury was able to compete with the more established record labels, and thus became an established record label itself.

Beginnings
Mercury Record Corporation was formed in Chicago in 1945 by Irving Green, Berle Adams, Ray Greenberg, and Arthur Talmadge. They were a major force in R&B, doo wop, soul music, pop doo wop, pop soul, blues, pop, rock and roll, jazz and classical music. Early in the label's history, Mercury opened two pressing plants, one in Chicago and the other in St. Louis, Missouri. By hiring two promoters, Tiny Hill and Jimmy Hilliard, they penetrated the pop market with names such as Frankie Laine, Vic Damone, Tony Fontane, and Patti Page.

In 1946, Mercury hired Eddie Gaedel, an American with dwarfism, most notable for participating in a Major League Baseball game, to portray the "Mercury Man", complete with a winged hat similar to its logo, to promote Mercury recordings. Some early Mercury recordings featured a caricature of him as their logo.

In 1947, Jack Rael, a musician and publicist/manager, persuaded Mercury to let Patti Page (whom he managed) record a song that had been planned to be done by Vic Damone, "Confess". The budget was too small for them to hire a second singer to provide the "answer" parts to Page, so at Rael's suggestion, she did both voices. Though "overdubbing" had been used occasionally on 78-rpm discs in the 1930s, for Enrico Caruso and Elisabeth Schumann recordings, among others, this became the first documented example of "overdubbing" using tape.

The company released an enormous number of recordings under the Mercury label, as well as its subsidiaries (Blue Rock Records, Cumberland Records, EmArcy Records, Smash Records, and Wing Records, later via Fontana Records and Limelight Records after being absorbed by Philips). In addition, they leased and purchased material by independent labels and redistributed them. Under their own label, Mercury released a variety of recording styles from classical music to psychedelic rock. Its subsidiaries, though, focused on their own specialized categories of music.

Mercury's jazz division

From 1947 to 1952, John Hammond was a vice-president of Mercury Records.  Mercury, under its EmArcy label, released LPs by many post-swing and bebop artists, including Clifford Brown and Max Roach, Kenny Drew, Dinah Washington, Nat Adderley, Cannonball Adderley, Ernestine Anderson, Sarah Vaughan, Maynard Ferguson, Walter Benton, Herb Geller. Late 1950s Mercury jazz recordings of multiple artists, including Max Roach, Coleman Hawkins, Lester Young, Dizzy Gillespie, and Buddy Rich. During the 1960s included albums by Gene Ammons, Quincy Jones, Buddy Rich, Cannonball Adderley, Charles (then called Charlie) Mingus, Dinah Washington, Sarah Vaughan, Max Roach, Paul Bley and Jimmy Smith.

Later history: 1950s – present

During the 1950s, Mercury released hits of musicians such as the Platters, Brook Benton, the Diamonds, and Patti Page.
In 1961, Philips, a Dutch electronics company and owner of Philips Records, which had lost its distribution deal with Columbia Records outside North America, played a key role in Mercury's future by signing an exchange agreement with the American Record Company. A year later, Mercury was sold to Consolidated Electronics Industries Corp. (Conelco), which was an affiliate of Philips under its U.S. Trust division; in 1963, Mercury switched British distribution from EMI to Philips. In 1962, Mercury began marketing a line of phonographs made by Philips bearing the Mercury brand name.

In July 1967, Mercury Records became the first U.S. record label to release cassette music tapes (Musicassettes). In 1969, Mercury changed its corporate name to Mercury Record Productions Inc., while its parent Conelco became North American Philips Corp. (NAPC) after Philips bought control of the company.

Philips and German electronics giant Siemens reorganized their joint-ventured record operations, Grammophon-Philips Group, home of Deutsche Grammophon, Philips Records, and Polydor to become PolyGram in 1972. That year, PolyGram bought Mercury from NAPC. Mercury's corporate name was changed to Phonogram Inc. to match a related company in the UK that operated the Mercury label there. During the 1970s, Mercury released hits by musicians such as Paper Lace, Rod Stewart, BTO and 10cc.

From late 1974 to early 1983, the company's label design featured a painting of three famous Chicago buildings: Marina City, John Hancock Center, and One IBM Plaza which was Mercury's headquarters during that period, having moved from its long-time address at 35 East Wacker Drive in Chicago. Mercury released soul musicians such as the Dells and Marvin Sease. From the 1970s through the early 1980s, Mercury released albums of funk musicians such as Ohio Players, the Bar-Kays, Con Funk Shun, and  Hamilton Bohannon. Mercury released  Kool & the Gang(De-Lite Records), the Gap Band and Cameo CDs. And the label released early rapper Kurtis Blow's hit "The Breaks"(1980) also. Mercury released blues musician Robert Cray.

In 1980, Phonogram moved its headquarters from Chicago to New York City. In 1981, Mercury, along with other U.S. PolyGram-owned labels, which included Polydor, RSO Records, and Casablanca, consolidated under the new name PolyGram Records, Inc. (now UMG Recordings). Under PolyGram, Mercury absorbed the artists and catalogue of Casablanca Records (also home to the 20th Century Records back catalogue), which consisted of hard rockers Kiss and disco stars Donna Summer and the Village People, and primarily became a rock/pop/new wave label with  Van Morrison, All About Eve, Julian Cope, Scorpions, Rush, John Cougar Mellencamp, Big Country, Tears for Fears, Bon Jovi, Cinderella, and Def Leppard.

Mercury, by having Bon Jovi, Cinderella, Def Leppard, Kiss, Treat, Candy, and Scorpions on their roster, was a premiere label for glam metal. Most of these bands were on Vertigo Records in Europe (that label specialized in progressive rock and hard rock including subgenres like glam metal).

In late 1998, PolyGram was bought by Seagram, which then absorbed the company into its Universal Music Group unit. Under the reorganization, Mercury Records was folded into the newly formed The Island Def Jam Music Group (IDJMG). Mercury's pop roster was predominantly taken over by Island Records, while its hip-hop artists found a new home at Def Jam Recordings, and some of Mercury's R&B acts were moved to the newly created Def Soul Records roster. Mercury's former country unit became Mercury Nashville Records. Mercury Records was relaunched in 2007 as a label under The Island Def Jam Music Group, appointing record executive David Massey as the President and CEO of the new venture. The label was defunct in 2015.
On April 11, 2022, Republic Records announced that they had acquired Mercury Records, and it will continue as their imprint.

The Mercury name also survives on the Mercury Records division of UMG France, the Mercury Studios film division (which absorbed Eagle Rock Entertainment, acquired by UMG in 2014), the classical music label Mercury KX, and catalogue reissues in the United States, United Kingdom, France, Japan, and Brazil, as well.

Mercury Living Presence series
In 1951, under the direction of recording engineer C. Robert (Bob) Fine and recording director David Hall, Mercury Records initiated a recording technique using a single microphone to record symphony orchestras. Fine had for several years used a single microphone for Mercury small-ensemble classical recordings produced by John Hammond and later Mitch Miller (indeed, Miller, using his full name of Mitchell Miller, made several recordings as a featured oboe player in the late 1940s for Mercury). The first record in this new Mercury Olympian Series was Pictures at an Exhibition performed by Rafael Kubelík and the Chicago Symphony. The group that became the best known using this technique was the Minneapolis Symphony Orchestra, which, under the leadership of conductor Antal Doráti, made a series of classical albums that were well reviewed and sold briskly, including the first-ever complete recordings of Tchaikovsky's ballets Swan Lake, The Sleeping Beauty, and The Nutcracker. Dorati's 1954 one-microphone monaural recording (Mercury MG 50054) and 1958 three-microphone stereo rerecording (Mercury MG 50054) of Tchaikovsky's 1812 Overture included dramatic overdub recordings of 1812-era artillery and the bells of the Yale University Carillon. A stereo release in 1960 featured new recordings of the cannon shots, and the bells of the Laura Spelman Rockefeller Memorial Carillon at the Riverside Church in Chicago. Besides Mercury's mono and stereo versions of the 1812, only one other classical album rang up gold-record sales in the 1950s in the U.S.  

The New York Times music critic Howard Taubman described the Mercury sound on Pictures at an Exhibition as "being in the living presence of the orchestra" and Mercury eventually began releasing their classical recordings under the 'Living Presence' series' name. The recordings were produced by Mercury vice president Wilma Cozart, who later married Bob Fine. Cozart took over recording director duties in 1953 and also produced the CD reissues of more than half of the Mercury Living Presence catalog in the 1990s. By the late 1950s, the Mercury Living Presence crew included session musical supervisors Harold Lawrence and Clair van Ausdall and associate engineer Robert Eberenz. 

Besides the recordings with the Chicago and Minneapolis orchestras, Mercury also recorded Howard Hanson with the Eastman Rochester Orchestra, Frederick Fennell with the Eastman Wind Ensemble, and Paul Paray with the Detroit Symphony Orchestra. 

In late 1955, Mercury began using three omnidirectional microphones to make stereo recordings on three-track tape. The technique was an expansion on the mono process—center was still paramount. Once the center, single microphone was set, the sides were set to provide the depth and width heard in the stereo recordings. The center microphone still fed the mono LP releases, which accompanied stereo LPs well into the 1960s. From 1961, Mercury enhanced the three-microphone stereo technique by using 35-mm magnetic film instead of half-inch tape for recording. The greater emulsion thickness, track width, and speed (90 ft/min or 18 in/sec) of 35-mm magnetic film increased prevention of tape layer print-through and gained in addition extended frequency range and transient response. The Mercury 'Living Presence' stereo records were mastered directly from the three-track tapes or magnetic film, with a 3-2 mix occurring in the mastering room. The same technique—and restored vintage equipment of the same type—was used during the CD reissues. Specifically, three-track tapes were recorded on Ampex 300-3 (½-in, three-track) machines at 15 in/sec. The 35-mm magnetic film recordings were made on three-track Westrex film recorders. The 3-2 mixdown was done on a modified Westrex mixer. For the original LPs, the mixer directly fed the custom cutting chain. At Fine Recording in New York City, the Westrex cutter head on a Scully lathe was fed by modified McIntosh 200W tube amplifiers with very little feedback in the system. Older mono records were made with a Miller cutter head. 

The original LP releases of the classical recordings continued through 1968. The Mercury classical-music catalogue (including the Living Presence catalogue) is currently managed by Decca Label Group through Philips Records, which reissued the recordings on LP and then CD. In turn, Mercury now manages the pop/rock catalog of Philips Records.

In 2012, Decca Classics, the current owner of the Mercury Living Presence label, issued a value-priced 51-CD box that included 50 of the 1990s CD titles (remastered by Wilma Cozart Fine), a bonus CD containing an interview with Wilma Cozart Fine, and a deluxe booklet detailing the history of Mercury Living Presence. The CD set was issued worldwide and was sold by major retailers. A limited-edition six-LP box set was also issued. The CD set brings back into print dozens of titles that had not been available as manufactured CDs since the early 2000s. 

In 2013, Decca Classics issued a second, 55-CD box set, along with a second six-LP box set. The CD box set included two bonus discs: a new reissue of the 1953 monophonic recording of Stravinsky's "Rite of Spring" by Dorati with the Minneapolis Symphony Orchestra, and a first-time-on-CD reissue of the premiere recording of John Corigliano's Piano Concerto, played by Hilde Somer with the San Antonio Symphony Orchestra conducted by Victor Alessandro. 

On January 4, 2015, Mercury co-founder Irwin Steinberg died at the age of 94.

Major Mercury Records labels and operations worldwide

This division of Mercury handled US distribution of most pre-1998 Polydor Records pop/rock releases currently under UMG control. Some exceptions remain, however. Some artists based outside the US did not have their releases on Polydor in North America, signing to various other labels, instead. Some of these bands, such as The Who, did sign to a label that also is now part of the UMG family (or later absorbed by such a label), hence those labels control US rights to these works (in the case of The Who, they had been on US Decca Records and MCA Records in the past, their prebreakup catalogue is now on Geffen Records in North America).

Mercury KX (formerly )

Mercury Classics was relaunched in 2012 as an international classical label by UMGI, appointing musicologist and record executive Dr. Alexander Buhr as managing director. The label aims to identify and work with strong creative individuals who bring a distinctive and fresh perspective to classical music.

In its first year, artist signings to the label included Icelandic neoclassical composer Olafur Arnalds, New York-based string quartet Brooklyn Rider, Chinese pianist Yundi, and Austrian clarinetist and Berlin Philharmonic soloist Andreas Ottensamer. The label also oversees the recording career of Montenegrin classical guitarist Milos Karadaglic, and has an ongoing partnership with Tori Amos, which dates back to her work with Buhr on her classically inspired Night of Hunters album for Deutsche Grammophon in 2011. Following Buhr's longstanding relationship with the Deutsche Grammophon label, some of Mercury Classics' early core classical recordings were rereleased under the aegis of sister company Deutsche Grammophon.

In 2013, Mercury Classics released Olafur Arnalds' label debut For Now I Am Winter, which entered the US Classical Chart at number one. It was followed by an EP of Arnalds' soundtrack of the much acclaimed ITV crime series Broadchurch, which received a BAFTA Award for best original soundtrack the following year. Yundi's recording of three Beethoven sonatas went platinum in his native China. The label also released Andreas Ottensamer's debut "Portraits", and the much acclaimed label debut of Brooklyn Rider "A Walking Fire". Milos Karadaglic's "Latino Gold" topped the UK classical charts and entered the pop charts. Legendary banjo soloist and 15-time Grammy Award winner Bela Fleck's concerto for banjo and orchestra "The Impostor" was released in the fall.

In 2014, Mercury Classics released "Aranjuez", Milos Karadaglic's recording of iconic guitar concertos by Joaquin Rodrigo, featuring Yannick Nézet-Séguin and the London Philharmonic Orchestra. The album topped the iTunes Classical charts in more than 10 countries and the classical charts in the US, UK, France, New Zealand, and Denmark, where it peaked in the pop charts at number 17. With the release of Yundi's new album Emperor/Fantasy, including Beethoven's 5th Piano Concerto with Berlin Philharmonic and Daniel Harding, Mercury Classics held the top two spots on the UK classical chart. In May 2014, the label released Tori Amos' 14th studio album Unrepentant Geraldines. The album entered the US Billboard top 200 at number seven, charted in UK (number 13), Netherlands (number 10), and Germany (number 15), and hit the iTunes top 10 in more than 20 countries.

Influential classical music website Alto Riot named Mercury Classics its Label of the Year 2013.

In 2016, Mercury Classics became Mercury KX and changed its focus to post-classical music

Mercury Nashville
Mercury's Nashville unit dates back to 1957, when Mercury formed a joint venture with Starday Records specifically for releasing artists performing country music. Mercury bought out Starday's half in 1958.

In 1997, PolyGram, looking to cut costs in anticipation of a merger with a competitor, consolidated all of its Nashville operations under the Mercury name. Mercury Nashville took over management of all of PolyGram's country back catalog from sister labels such as Polydor (including releases once issued by MGM Records), A&M, and the small country back catalog of Motown Records (Motown released these albums under subsidiary labels). All country artists under contract to other PolyGram labels either moved to Mercury or were dropped altogether.

Today, Mercury Nashville continues to be an active imprint under Universal Music Group Nashville, where it continues to manage the country back catalog that once belonged to PolyGram (MCA Nashville manages what Universal had already owned at the time of the PolyGram merger).

Mercury Records (UK)
In 1958, Mercury switched its distribution in the UK from Pye to EMI, and in 1964 to Philips.

Mercury operated as an imprint in the UK under Phonogram, a division of Dutch electronics company Philips from the mid-1960s until 1998, when Phonogram was bought by Universal Music. In March 2013, its artist roster was moved to Virgin EMI in a restructuring of Universal's UK labels.

In 2005, Jason Iley was appointed the new managing director of Mercury. He joined the company from Island Records, where he was general manager. In July 2005, Iley appointed Paul Adam to senior artist and repertoire (A&R) director of the label; the two had previously worked together at Island Records.

In October 2006, U2 decided to leave Island Records and moved to Mercury Records, reportedly to rejoin Iley, with whom they had worked previously at Island Records.

In March 2011, the label announced it was stopping the production of CD and vinyl singles, and would only release them physically as "rare exceptions".

In 2012, signings on Mercury included Pixie Lott, Arcade Fire, Amy Macdonald, Noah and the Whale, Chase & Status, Jake Bugg, and Bo Bruce.

In July, Mercury announced that Mike Smith was joining as president of its music division.

In March 2013, Mercury UK was absorbed into Virgin EMI by Universal Music. Virgin EMI was rebranded as EMI Records in June 2020.

Mercury Records (Australia)
Launched in 1955 exclusively as a full-service local (Australian) A&R operation. Mercury Records first known Australian artist was Keith Potger in 1968, but the label was put into hibernation in 1999 in favour of the Universal label until 2007–2013. Some successful Australian artists on Mercury included: INXS, Kamahl, Bullamakanka, Darren Hayes, Carl Riseley, The Preatures, Tiddas, Dragon, Teen Queens, Melissa Tkautz and Karise Eden.

Mercury Records (France)
In France, Mercury Records operates as a part of the Mercury Music Group, a division of Universal Music Group, which Group controls the French operations of UMG labels Mercury, Fontana Records, Verve Records, Decca Records, Blue Note Records, Island Records, and Virgin Records, among others.

Various other national Universal Music Group companies are known to actively use the Mercury Records trademark as an imprint for their local A&R operations, but no other Universal Music Group companies use the label as a key marketing differentiator, nor do they operate frontline divisions based on the Mercury label.

Mercury Tokyo (formerly Mercury Music Entertainment, Nippon Phonogram and Kitty MME)
The Mercury label was first launched in Japan in 1952, by Taihei Onkyo. The company's name was later changed to Nippon Mercury in 1953, however, the Mercury label started to be handled by King Records in 1957, and later by Nippon Victor.

It was relaunched in 1970 by Nippon Victor and Matsushita Corporation, as Nippon Phonogram. It operated several Phonogram labels in Japan. In 1993, it became a division of PolyGram K.K. (now Universal Music Japan). In 1995, it was relaunched as Mercury Music Entertainment. It later merged with Kitty Records in 2000 and became Kitty MME. Half of it was merged into the Universal J label in 2002, the other half became known as Universal Sigma in 2004. Its artist roster included Seiko Matsuda, Yūji Oda, Delta, ZIGGY, Kinniku Shōjo Tai, and Takashi Sorimachi.

After 13 years, the label was revitalized under its new name, Mercury Tokyo, under the Universal Music and Brands (UM & Brands) division of Universal Music Japan. K-pop group Monsta X was the first artist or group signed under the newly relaunched label. As of 2022, the label, currently operating under UMJ's EMI Records division, has added K-pop groups Golden Child, Drippin, and Loona on its roster.

See also
 Chicago record labels
 List of Mercury Records artists
 List of record labels

References

External links

Main sites
Mercury Records US site
Mercury Records UK site

Mercury Records Australian site

Mercury Nashville – official site

Other sites
Microgroove.jp – a site devoted to the label's history
 – Wilma Cozart Fine and 50 Years Mercury Records
Mercury US & UK A&R team contact list
Jay & The Techniques article in The Standard Report
Interview with Wilma Cozart Fine by Bruce Duffie

American record labels
Rhythm and blues record labels
Soul music record labels
Rock and roll record labels
Jazz record labels
Soundtrack record labels
History of Chicago
Island Records
Republic Records
Philips
Record labels established in 1945
Labels distributed by Universal Music Group
Companies based in New York City